The Hong Kong Film Award for Best Director is an award presented annually at the Hong Kong Film Awards (HKFA). It is given to honour the best director of a Hong Kong film. The 1st Hong Kong Film Awards ceremony was held in 1982, with no formal nomination procedure established; the award was given to Allen Fong for his direction of Father and Son. After the first award ceremony, a nomination system was put in place whereby no more than five nominations are made for each category and each entry is selected through two rounds of voting. Firstly, prospective nominees are marked with a weight of 50% each from HKFA voters and a hundred professional adjudicators, contributing towards a final score with which the top five nominees advance to the second round of voting. The winner is then selected via a scoring process where 55% of the vote comes from 55 professional adjudicators, 25% from representatives of the Hong Kong Film Directors' Guild and 20% from all other HKFA Executive Committee Members.

From the 2nd Hong Kong Film Awards (1983), there are five, sometimes 6, nominations for the category of Best Director from which one director is chosen the winner of the Hong Kong Film Award for Best Director. The most recent recipient of the award was Derek Tsang, who was honoured at the 39th Hong Kong Film Awards (2020), for his film Better Days. The directors with most awards in this category is Ann Hui with six wins, followed by Allen Fong, Johnnie To, Tsui Hark and Wong Kar-wai with 3 times each.

Winners and nominees

Multiple wins and nominations

The following individuals received two or more Best Director awards:

The following individuals received three or more Best Director nominations:

See also
 Hong Kong Film Award
 Hong Kong Film Award for Best Actor
 Hong Kong Film Award for Best Actress
 Hong Kong Film Award for Best Supporting Actor
 Hong Kong Film Award for Best Supporting Actress
 Hong Kong Film Award for Best Action Choreography
 Hong Kong Film Award for Best Cinematography
 Hong Kong Film Award for Best Film
 Hong Kong Film Award for Best New Performer

Notes 
  A film is considered to be a "Hong Kong film" by meeting at least 2 of the following criteria:
 The film's director is a Hong Kong resident that holds a Hong Kong Identity Card
 At least one of the film's production companies are legally registered in Hong Kong SAR.
 At least one person involved in the film's production from any six separate award categories who are Hong Kong resident holding a Hong Kong Identity Card.

References

External links
 Hong Kong Film Awards Official Site

Awards for best director
Hong Kong Film Awards
Awards established in 1982